Electron crystallography is a method to determine the arrangement of atoms in solids using a transmission electron microscope (TEM). It can involve the use of high-resolution transmission electron microscopy images, electron diffraction patterns including convergent-beam electron diffraction or combinations of these. It has been successful in determining some bulk structures, and also surface structures. Two related methods are low-energy electron diffraction which has solved the structure of many surfaces, and reflection high-energy electron diffraction which is used to monitor surfaces often during growth.

Comparison with X-ray crystallography 
It can complement X-ray crystallography for studies of very small crystals (<0.1 micrometers), both inorganic, organic, and proteins, such as membrane proteins, that cannot easily form the large 3-dimensional crystals required for that process. Protein structures are usually determined from either 2-dimensional crystals (sheets or helices), polyhedrons such as viral capsids, or dispersed individual proteins. Electrons can be used in these situations, whereas X-rays cannot, because electrons interact more strongly with atoms than X-rays do. Thus, X-rays will travel through a thin 2-dimensional crystal without diffracting significantly, whereas electrons can be used to form an image. Conversely, the strong interaction between electrons and protons makes thick (e.g. 3-dimensional > 1 micrometer) crystals impervious to electrons, which only penetrate short distances.

One of the main difficulties in X-ray crystallography is determining phases in the diffraction pattern. Because of the complexity of X-ray lenses, it is difficult to form an image of the crystal being diffracted, and hence phase information is lost. Fortunately, electron microscopes can resolve atomic structure in real space and the crystallographic structure factor phase information can be experimentally determined from an image's Fourier transform. The Fourier transform of an atomic resolution image is similar, but different, to a diffraction pattern—with reciprocal lattice spots reflecting the symmetry and spacing of a crystal.  Aaron Klug was the first to realize that the phase information could be read out directly from the Fourier transform of an electron microscopy image that had been scanned into a computer, already in 1968. For this, and his studies on virus structures and transfer-RNA, Klug received the Nobel Prize for chemistry in 1982.

Radiation damage 
A common problem to X-ray crystallography and electron crystallography is radiation damage, by which especially organic molecules and proteins are damaged as they are being imaged, limiting the resolution that can be obtained.  This is especially troublesome in the setting of electron crystallography, where that radiation damage is focused on far fewer atoms. One technique used to limit radiation damage is electron cryomicroscopy, in which the samples undergo cryofixation and imaging takes place at liquid nitrogen or even liquid helium temperatures. Because of this problem, X-ray crystallography has been much more successful in determining the structure of proteins that are especially vulnerable to radiation damage. Radiation damage was recently investigated using MicroED of thin 3D crystals in a frozen hydrated state.

Protein structures determined by electron crystallography 
The first electron crystallographic protein structure to achieve atomic resolution was bacteriorhodopsin, determined by Richard Henderson and coworkers at the Medical Research Council Laboratory of Molecular Biology in 1990. However, already in 1975 Unwin and Henderson had determined the first membrane protein structure at intermediate resolution (7 Ångström), showing for the first time the internal structure of a membrane protein, with its alpha-helices standing perpendicular to the plane of the membrane. Since then, several other high-resolution structures have been determined by electron crystallography, including the light-harvesting complex, the nicotinic acetylcholine receptor, and the bacterial flagellum. The highest resolution protein structure solved by electron crystallography of 2D crystals is that of the water channel aquaporin-0. In 2013 electron crystallography was extended to 3D crystals by a new method called microcrystal electron diffraction, or MicroED.

Application to inorganic materials 
Electron crystallographic studies on inorganic crystals using high-resolution electron microscopy (HREM) images were first performed by Aaron Klug in 1978 and by Sven Hovmöller and coworkers in 1984. HREM images were used because they allow to select (by computer software) only the very thin regions close to the edge of the crystal for structure analysis (see also crystallographic image processing). This is of crucial importance since in the thicker parts of the crystal the exit-wave function (which carries the information about the intensity and position of the projected atom columns) is no longer linearly related to the projected crystal structure. Moreover, not only do the HREM images change their appearance with increasing crystal thickness, they are also very sensitive to the chosen setting of the defocus Δf of the objective lens (see the HREM images of GaN for example). To cope with this complexity methods based upon the Cowley-Moodie multislice algorithm and non-linear imaging theory have been developed to simulate images; this only became possible once the FFT method was developed.

There was a serious disagreement in the field of electron microscopy of inorganic compounds; while some have claimed that "the phase information is present in EM images" others have the opposite view that "the phase information is lost in EM images". The reason for these opposite views is that the word "phase" has been used with different meanings in the two communities of physicists and crystallographers. The physicists are more concerned about the "electron wave phase" - the phase of a wave moving through the sample during exposure by the electrons. This wave has a wavelength of about 0.02-0.03 Ångström (depending on the accelerating voltage of the electron microscope). Its phase is relative to the phase of the undiffracted direct electron beam. The crystallographers, on the other hand, mean the "crystallographic structure factor phase" when they simply say "phase". This phase is the phase of standing waves of potential in the crystal (very similar to the electron density measured in X-ray crystallography). Each of these waves have their specific wavelength, called d-value for distance between so-called Bragg planes of low/high potential. These d-values range from the unit cell dimensions to the resolution limit of the electron microscope, i.e. typically from 10 or 20 Ångströms down to 1 or 2 Ångströms. Their phases are related to a fixed point in the crystal, defined in relation to the symmetry elements of that crystal. The crystallographic phases are a property of the crystal, so they exist also outside the electron microscope. The electron waves vanish if the microscope is switched off. In order to determine a crystal structure, it is necessary to know the crystallographic structure factors, but not to know the electron wave phases. A more detailed discussion how (crystallographic structure factor) phases link with the phases of the electron wave can be found in.

Just as with proteins, it has been possible to determine the atomic structures of inorganic crystals by electron crystallography. For simpler structure it is sufficient to use three perpendicular views, but for more complicated structures, also projections down ten or more different diagonals may be needed.

In addition to electron microscopy images, it is also possible to use electron diffraction (ED) patterns for crystal structure determination. The utmost care must be taken to record such ED patterns from the thinnest areas in order to keep most of the structure related intensity differences between the reflections (quasi-kinematical diffraction conditions). Just as with X-ray diffraction patterns, the important crystallographic structure factor phases are lost in electron diffraction patterns and must be uncovered by special crystallographic methods such as direct methods, maximum likelihood or (more recently) by the charge-flipping method. On the other hand, ED patterns of inorganic crystals have often a high resolution (= interplanar spacings with high Miller indices) much below 1 Ångström. This is comparable to the point resolution of the best electron microscopes. Under favourable conditions it is possible to use ED patterns from a single orientation to determine the complete crystal structure. Alternatively a hybrid approach can be used which uses HRTEM images for solving and intensities from ED for refining the crystal structure.

Recent progress for structure analysis by ED was made by introducing the Vincent-Midgley precession technique for recording electron diffraction patterns. The thereby obtained intensities are usually much closer to the kinematical intensities, so that even structures can be determined that are out of range when processing conventional (selected area) electron diffraction data.

Crystal structures determined via electron crystallography can be checked for their quality by using first-principles calculations within density functional theory (DFT). This approach has been used to assist in solving surface structures and for the validation of several metal-rich structures which were only accessible by HRTEM and ED, respectively.

Recently, two very complicated zeolite structures have been determined by electron crystallography combined with X-ray powder diffraction. These are more complex than the most complex zeolite structures determined by X-ray crystallography.

References

Further reading
Zou, XD, Hovmöller, S. and Oleynikov, P. "Electron Crystallography - Electron microscopy and Electron Diffraction". IUCr Texts on Crystallography 16, Oxford university press 2011. http://ukcatalogue.oup.com/product/9780199580200.do  T.E. Weirich, X.D. Zou & J.L. Lábár (2006). Electron Crystallography: Novel Approaches for Structure Determination of Nanosized Materials''. Springer Netherlands,

External links
Interview with Aaron Klug Nobel Laureate for work on crystallograph electron microscopy Freeview video by the Vega Science Trust.

Crystallography
Protein structure